Taman Daya is a suburb in Johor Bahru, Johor, Malaysia. Its main road is Jalan Daya.

History
The township was opened on 1992.

Education
Sekolah Menengah Kebangsaan Taman Daya 
Sekolah Kebangsaan Taman Daya 
Sekolah Menengah Kebangsaan Taman Daya 2 
Sekolah Kebangsaan Taman Daya 2 
Sekolah Menengah Kebangsaan Tun Fatimah Hashim 
Sekolah Kebangsaan Taman Daya 3 
Sekolah Agama Taman Daya

Places of worships

Mosques and suraus
Masjid as-Sobirin (Rumbia)
Masjid An-Najah (Sagu)
Surau al- Hidayah (Bertam)
Surau al-Mukminin (Pinang 29)
Surau an-Nur (Nibong)
Surau at-Taqwa (Pinang 60)

Buddhist Temple
 Jue Ming Buddhist Temple (新山福林园觉明寺)
 Thsurphu Chogong Goshir Yeshi Ling

Chinese temple
Hock Lin Temple (新山福林园福灵宫)
Ji Sheng Temple(新山福林园济圣宫)
Fu Long Temple (新山福林园聖阜宮)

Hindu temples
There is a Vishnu Temple opposite to the School and beside the Chinese Temple. Lord Vishnu is worshipped here. Many Indians assemble here on Indian festival days. Daily pooja is conducted.

Churches
Daya Gospel Centre (Brethren Assembly with English, Chinese and Youth Group)

Full Gospel Tabernacle Johor Bahru

Facilities
Taman Daya Hockey Stadium (venue of the Men's Hockey Junior World Cup (Under-21))
Sekolah Memandu Berjaya (Berjaya Driving School)
Daya Point shopping complex
Malaysian Road Transport Department (JPJ) Johor state headquarters
Puspakom
Econsave
Pejabat POS Taman Daya
Super Education Group
Indoor Trampoline Park
Medan Selera Rumbia
Dewan Serbaguna Taman Daya
A lot of ENY

Transportation
The suburb is accessible by Causeway Link route 10B from Johor Bahru Sentral railway station to Setia Indah.

References

Johor Bahru housing estates
Townships in Johor